Naushahro Feroze is a city in Sindh, Pakistan.

Naushahro Feroze may also refer to:

Naushahro Feroze District, an administrative unit of Sindh, Pakistan
Naushahro Feroze railway station, a railway station in Pakistan

See also